Gerald Thomas (1920–1993) was an English film director.

Gerald Thomas may also refer to:

 Gerald Thomas (theatre director) (born 1954), Brazilian-American theater director and writer
 Gerald C. Thomas (1894–1984), United States Marine Corps general
 Gerald Eustis Thomas (born 1929), American admiral, diplomat and academic
 Gerald W. Thomas (born 1919), president emeritus of New Mexico State University

See also
Gerard Thomas (1663–1721), Flemish Baroque painter
Gerry Thomas (1922–2005), American salesman
Jerry Thomas (disambiguation)